Tom L. Slater (November 5, 1945 – March 17, 2018) was an American politician in the state of Iowa.

Slater was born in Templeton, Iowa and he attended Washburn University and Iowa State University. Slater was a public relations consultant, designer, and businessman. In 1984, he established the State Public Policy Group, which helps nonprofits and other groups with advocacy work on public policy issues that have ranged from homelessness to homeland security. He served in the Iowa State Senate from 1977 to 1985, as a Democrat representing Council Bluffs and Pottawattamie County.

References

1945 births
Living people
Democratic Party Iowa state senators